Enterobacteria phage T6 is a bacteriophage strain that infects Escherichia coli bacteria. It was one bacteriophage that was used as a model system in the 1950s in exploring the methods viruses replicate, along with the other T-even bacteriophages (which build up virus species Escherichia virus T4, a member of genus T4virus according to ICTV nomenclature): Enterobacteria phage T2, Enterobacteria phage T4 and Enterobacteria phage T2.

References

Myoviridae
Infraspecific virus taxa